WKCL (91.5 FM) is a radio station broadcasting a Christian radio format. Licensed to Ladson, South Carolina, United States, it serves the Charleston metropolitan area.  The station is owned by Chapel of the Holy Spirit Church & Bible College.

External links

KCL
KCL
Radio stations established in 1981